Kabwe Central is a constituency of the National Assembly of Zambia. It covers part of Kabwe District in Central Province.

History
The constituency was established in 1926 as Northern, covering Broken Hill, Kasempa, Mkushi, Mwinilunga, Ndola and Solwezi. In 1929 Abercorn, Chinsali, Isoka, Kasama, Luwingu, Mpika and Mporokoso were added to the constituency, whilst Kasempa, Ndola and Solwezi were transferred to the new Ndola constituency.

In 1941 the constituency was renamed Broken Hill, covering only Broken Hill, Mkushi and Serenje, with the remaining settlements transferred to the new North-Eastern constituency. It was reduced in size again in 1948, now covering only the urban area of Broken Hill and the northern part of the Broken Hill rural area.

The constituency was renamed Kabwe in 1964, and became Kabwe Central in 2001.

List of MPs

References

Constituencies of the National Assembly of Zambia
1926 establishments in Northern Rhodesia
Constituencies established in 1926